Michael Williams (born February 14, 1957) is an American producer.  He won an Academy Award for Best Documentary Feature for the documentary The Fog of War: Eleven Lessons from the Life of Robert S. McNamara in 2004.  He also won an Emmy Award in 2004 for Queer Eye for the Straight Guy, which he created. He is co-owner and principal of Scout Productions, a film and television production company based in Los Angeles, California. He graduated from the School of Communications at  Boston University. In 1979, Williams began his career as a location scout for Spenser for Hire, which filmed in Boston.

References

External links
 

1957 births
Living people
American film producers
Boston University College of Communication alumni
Primetime Emmy Award winners